is a Japanese footballer currently playing as a goalkeeper and studying at the Sakushin Gakuin University.

Career statistics

Club
.

Notes

References

External links

2001 births
Living people
Japanese footballers
Sakushin Gakuin University alumni
Association football goalkeepers
J3 League players
FC Tokyo players
FC Tokyo U-23 players